World War II Frontline Command is a real-time strategy, 3D, tactical war game for Windows that was developed by long standing developers, the Bitmap Brothers. It was originally released in Europe during September 2002 by Deep Silver and subsequently released in June 2003 by Focus Multimedia.

Plot
The game is set within the era of World War II. The game opens with the player dropping paratroopers into Europe to disrupt the entrenched Axis forces ahead of the main invasion forces set to land on D-Day.

Gameplay
Players must take command of their forces and turn the tide of Axis aggression while conquering fortress Europe, using a vast amount of authentic infantry, vehicles and weaponry. Mission objectives include destroying bridges, clearing bunkers, and knocking down radar towers. There are no resources to be collected or buildings to be constructed.

World War II Frontline Command features two play modes, recruit and veteran, that share some of the same mission maps. Enemy units are attracted to noise so using gunfire may attract unwanted attention. A morale system has been incorporated meaning that after losses are sustained, performance will be adversely affected.

Development
Gaming Director, Jamie Barber noted that the game engine used in the creation of Z: Steel Soldiers was upgraded in the development of Frontline Command.

Reception

The game acquired a generally positive reception by reviewers. A Eurogamer reviewer felt the game was realistic, had detailed graphics and a very good interface that allowed complex actions.

An IGN Entertainment review felt the sounds were nothing remarkable and both the cut scenes and tutorial mode were un-original and standard. Another review at GameSpot, felt the ideas behind the game were good, but the implementation was flawed.

See also

List of strategy video games
List of World War II video games

References

External links
Official site

2003 video games
Windows games
Windows-only games
Real-time strategy video games
World War II video games
Video games developed in the United Kingdom
Deep Silver games
The Bitmap Brothers games
Strategy First games
Focus Multimedia games